A toque is any of a variety of hats.

Toque may also refer to:

 La Tuque, Quebec, a Canadian city
 Toques, Spain, Spanish municipality
 Flamenco guitar playing
 Toque, a ceremony or polyrhythmic composition using the Batá drum
 Toque, a ritual in the Candomblé religion
 Tuque (toque), a type of winter hat

See also

 Toque-Toque Islands, São Sebastião, São Paulo, Brazil
 
 Tuque (disambiguation)
 Touques (disambiguation)
 Toke (disambiguation)